José Edipo Deodato dos Santos or Ebinho for short (born 18 January 1988 in Guarabira, Paraíba) is a Brazilian professional footballer, who plays as a fast and header forward. He is currently in Associação Cultural e Desportiva Potiguar.

Ebinho joined Portuguese side Marítimo in 2014, but he struggled to adapt to playing as a striker only scoring twice during his first season.

References

External links

1988 births
Living people
Brazilian footballers
Brazilian expatriate footballers
América Futebol Clube (RN) players
Club Sportivo Sergipe players
C.S. Marítimo players
Primeira Liga players
Expatriate footballers in Portugal
Association football forwards
Sportspeople from Paraíba